South Tamworth is a suburb of Tamworth, New South Wales, Australia and is situated south from the cities Central Business District. It is a largely residential suburb and is a mixture of both new housing estates and well established estates. Southgate Shopping Centre, Robert Street Shopping Centre, Chaffey Park and Hyman Park are all located in South Tamworth.

Schools

South Tamworth Public School
 Tamworth High School
 Saint Edwards Primary School
 Bullimbal School

References

Suburbs of Tamworth, New South Wales